The Shafer Barn is a -story gambrel-roofed barn that was built in 1920 near Hoxie, Kansas.  It is located on County Road 50S, 1.5 miles (2.4 km) west of County Road 80E, in West Saline Township.  It was listed on the National Register of Historic Places in 2009.

It was deemed significant as an excellent example of the gambrel roof type, which was just becoming more common than gable roofs in new barns in Kansas in the 1920s, for their increased capacity for hay storage.  This barn seems to have been designed to host barn dances, as there was "a ladies toilet and smoking room on the first floor and a raised platform/stage in the haymow."

References

Barns on the National Register of Historic Places in Kansas
Buildings and structures completed in 1920
Buildings and structures in Sheridan County, Kansas
Barns in Kansas
National Register of Historic Places in Sheridan County, Kansas